Theodore Roosevelt Highway or Roosevelt Highway may refer to:
Theodore Roosevelt International Highway in the United States and Canada
Roosevelt Highway (Georgia) in the United States
Roosevelt Highway (Washington) in the United States
Roosevelt Highway (Oregon) on the Pacific coast
Roosevelt Highway, an old name for the Pacific Coast Highway within Los Angeles County, California
Roosevelt Midland Trail in the United States
Churchill–Roosevelt Highway in Trinidad and Tobago

See also
 Theodore Roosevelt (disambiguation)